The Nicaragua women's national football team is controlled by the Federación Nicaragüense de Fútbol.

Results and fixtures

The following is a list of match results in the last 12 months, as well as any future matches that have been scheduled.

Legend

2021

2022

Nicaragua Results and Fixtures – Soccerway.com
Nicaragua Results and Fixtures – FIFA.com

Coaching staff

Current coaching staff

Manager history
 Elna Dixon (2006–2007)
 Henry Alvarado (2007 – February 2011)
 Óscar Blanco (March 2011 – June 2011)
 Ederlei Aparecido Pereira Pedroso (June 2011 – June 2013)
 Jeniffer Fernández (June 2013 – October 2014) 
 Antonio Macías  (October 2014 – March 2015)
 Elna Dixon (second term) (March 2015–)

Players

Current squad
The following players were called up for the match against Dominica on 12 April 2022.
Caps and goals as of 22 February 2022

Recent call-ups

Notable players
Ana Cate
Lena Elizabeth Torres Tapia
Alina Nalgado

Competitive record

FIFA Women's World Cup

*Draws include knockout matches decided on penalty kicks.

Olympic Games

*Draws include knockout matches decided on penalty kicks.

CONCACAF Women's Championship

*Draws include knockout matches decided on penalty kicks.

Pan American Games

*Draws include knockout matches decided on penalty kicks.

Central American and Caribbean Games

*Draws include knockout matches decided on penalty kicks.

Central American Games

*Draws include knockout matches decided on penalty kicks.

References

External links
Official website
FIFA profile

Nicaragua women's national football team
Central American women's national association football teams